Rožmitál na Šumavě is a municipality and village in Český Krumlov District in the South Bohemian Region of the Czech Republic. It has about 400 inhabitants.

Administrative parts
Villages of Čeřín, Hněvanov, Michnice and Zahrádka are administrative parts of Rožmitál na Šumavě.

References

Villages in Český Krumlov District